Tom Watt (born June 17, 1935) is a professional ice hockey scout for the Toronto Maple Leafs of the National Hockey League (NHL). Watt has served as a coach in the NHL for 11 seasons, including seven as a head coach, four as assistant coach and one as development coach. As head coach of the Winnipeg Jets, he won the Jack Adams Award as the NHL Coach of the Year in 1981–82.

Early career
In 1964 Watt became the head of men's phys-ed at Monarch Park Secondary School in Toronto.

In 1965, he began a highly-successful 15-season stint as head coach at the University of Toronto of the CIAU (Canadian Inter-University Athletic Union), where he had also played during his undergraduate studies. Under Watt's guidance, the University of Toronto's Varsity Blues men's ice hockey team hockey teams captured 11 conference titles and nine CIAU championships.

Returning in 1984–1985 between his NHL tenures in Winnipeg and Vancouver, he replaced NHL-bound Mike Keenan, and was later honoured by Ontario Universities Athletics in 1992.

Professional coaching career
Watt broke into the NHL coaching ranks as an assistant coach with the Vancouver Canucks in 1980–81. His first NHL head coaching experience came with the Winnipeg Jets, whom he guided for two-plus seasons (1981 to 1984). In 1981–82, Watt helped the Jets to a 48-point improvement in the standings, and was named Coach of the Year, winning the Jack Adams Award for his efforts.

He held the positions of head coach and assistant general manager with the Canucks for two seasons beginning in 1985–86. Watt was then an assistant coach with the Calgary Flames from 1988 to 1990, including the Stanley Cup-winning 1989 club. In 1990 he was hired in as an assistant coach with the Toronto Maple Leafs, and took over as head coach just 12 games into the 1990–91 NHL season. After two seasons behind the Maple Leafs' bench, he served within the Toronto organization as director of professional development in 1992–93 and director of pro scouting in 1993–94. Watt then became the head coach for the Leafs' farm club, the St. John's Maple Leafs of the American Hockey League (AHL) for two seasons beginning in 1994–95.

Watt spent 1997–98 season as head coach of the Sudbury Wolves of the Ontario Hockey League (OHL), returning the Wolves to the playoffs after a three-year absence.

In 1999–2000, Watt returned to the NHL as a development coach for the Flames. Watt then joined the Mighty Ducks of Anaheim on January 5, 2001, as special assignment scout. On July 24, 2001, he was an assistant coach for the Mighty Ducks, and was reassigned to player development July 1, 2002. Watt joined the Florida Panthers on August 16, 2005, as a pro scout. In September 2008 Watt returned to the Maple Leafs organization as one of the Leafs' pro scouts.

International
Watt's international experience with Team Canada includes two Olympic games, two World Hockey Championships and three Canada Cup assistant coaching assignments.

Honours
Watt was inducted as an honoured member into the Etobicoke Sports Hall of Fame on October 20, 2005.

In 1971, Watt also wrote a "best seller" book on "How to Play Hockey".

Coaching record

References

External links 

1935 births
Living people
Anaheim Ducks
Anaheim Ducks scouts
Calgary Flames coaches
Canada men's national ice hockey team coaches
Florida Panthers scouts
Jack Adams Award winners
St. John's Maple Leafs coaches
Ice hockey people from Toronto
Stanley Cup champions
Sudbury Wolves coaches
Toronto Maple Leafs coaches
Toronto Maple Leafs scouts
Vancouver Canucks coaches
Vancouver Canucks executives
Winnipeg Jets (1972–1996) coaches